The Olive Schreiner Prize has been awarded annually since 1961 to emerging writers in the field of drama, prose, or poetry. It is named after Olive Schreiner, the South African author and activist. It rewards promising novice work, by writers who are not yet regarded as "established" in the genre. It rotates annually among the genres of drama, prose, and poetry. The prize for each genre is therefore triennial, and is open to work published in the three years since it was last awarded. 

The Prize was established in 1961 by the Suid-Afrikaanse Akademie vir Wetenskap en Kuns (SAAWK), and was transferred to the English Academy of Southern Africa in 1972. The Prize was previously sponsored by Shell South Africa, and later by FNB, and under SAAWK was open only to works published in South Africa or Rhodesia by a writer from one of those countries. It is now open to works published in southern African countries by citizens of southern African countries generally. It is not highly remunerated – by 1987, it was worth only R500, and in 2010 was worth R5 000 – but is considered prestigious.

As of 2018, the Prize could not be awarded to the same writer more than twice. To date, this disqualifies only two writers: Rustum Kozain, who has won the poetry prize twice, and Zakes Mda, who has won for both drama and prose.

Prizewinners

References 

South African literary awards
Awards established in 1964
Poetry awards
Fiction awards
Dramatist and playwright awards
South African literary events
1964 establishments in South Africa